Buick Men is the debut studio album by the American rock band Hagfish. It was released in 1993 on Dragon Street Records. Eight of the album's tracks would be re-recorded for the follow-up Rocks Your Lame Ass.

Critical reception
Trouser Press wrote that the band "sets broad locker-room humor against cuddly (if raucous) power pop riffing. Since they’re as willing to mock themselves (see 'New Punk Rock Song') as the outside things they lampoon, it’s hard to hold the dopiness of, say, 'Lesbian Girl' against Hagfish."

Track listing
All songs written by George Stroud Reagan III except where noted.

 "Happiness" – 1:55
 "Stamp" – 2:27
 "Flat" – 2:22
 "Secret" – 1:47
 "Gertrude" (Reagan, Zach Blair, Doni Blair) – 2:47
 "Moda" (Reagan, Z. Blair) – 1:52
 "Sad" – 2:54
 "Trixie" – 2:05
 "New Punk Rock Song" – 1:08
 "Disappointed" – 2:29
 "Minit Maid" (Reagan, Z. Blair) – 1:52
 "Hose" (Reagan, Z. Blair, D. Blair) – 3:04
 "Shark" – 1:31
 "Lesbian Girl" – 2:22
 "Herve" – 1:50
 "Aquarium" – 2:00
 "Mouse" – 1:48
Bonus tracks
 "Ambulance" – 1:14
 "Land Shark (alt. mix)" – 1:31

Personnel
George Stroud Reagan III – lead vocals
Zach Blair – guitar, backing vocals
Doni Blair – bass guitar
Tony Barsotti – drums, backing vocals
Additional personnel
Scott Carter – drums on tracks 2, 4, 6, 8, 9, 13–17 and 19
Patrick Keel – producer
David Dennard – executive producer, creative direction
Kerry Crafton – engineer
John Berka – assistant engineer
Todd Linton – assistant engineer
Frank Laudo – design, art direction
John Noeding – cover photograph, CD surface
Jack L. Zeman – band photography

References

Hagfish (band) albums
1993 debut albums